Rishat Khaibullin (born 21 September 1995) is a Kazakh climber, who specializes in speed climbing. He won the bronze medal in the combined event at the 2019 IFSC Climbing World Championships, which qualified him for the 2020 Summer Olympics. He is also a Master of Sports on International Class. He lives and trains in Brno, Czech Republic. Khaibullin is from Tatar descent.

International Competitions

References

Kazakhstani rock climbers
Living people
1995 births
Sportspeople from Almaty
Sport climbers at the 2020 Summer Olympics
Olympic sport climbers of Kazakhstan
Sport climbers at the 2018 Asian Games
Tatar sportspeople
Kazakhstani people of Tatar descent
Competitors at the 2022 World Games
21st-century Kazakhstani people
IFSC Climbing World Championships medalists